The O'Keefes is an American television sitcom created by Mark O'Keefe, that aired on The WB from May 22 to June 12, 2003.

Premise
The series was about the O'Keefe family: Harry and Ellie, together with their children, Lauren, Danny and Mark. The plot centered on the fact that the O'Keefe parents had homeschooled their children for most of their lives and with the dramatic and comic interest arising in situations where the children were beginning to experience the outside world.

There was a lot of controversy about this show among parents who homeschool their children, as they felt it portrayed homeschooling in a negative light.

Cast
 Judge Reinhold as Harrison Fitzpatrick "Harry" O'Keefe
 Kirsten Nelson as Ellie O'Keefe
 Tania Raymonde as Lauren O'Keefe
 Joseph Cross as Danny O'Keefe
 Matt Weinberg as Mark O'Keefe

Episodes

References

External links
 

2000s American single-camera sitcoms
2003 American television series debuts
2003 American television series endings
English-language television shows
Television series about families
Television series by Warner Bros. Television Studios
The WB original programming
Works about homeschooling and unschooling
Homeschooling in the United States